XXXY may refer to:

 XXXY (film), 2000, a documentary.
 XX/XY (film), 2002, a romantic drama.
 XXXY syndrome